St Paul's Cathedral, built in 1710, was the tallest building in London at  until it was overtaken in 1963 by the Millbank Tower at , which in turn was overtaken by the BT Tower which topped out at  tall in 1964. In the 1960s and 1970s several high-rise buildings were built, located sporadically, mostly in the western side of Central London with some in the City of London. The 2000s saw a boom in skyscraper building, mostly in the City of London and Canary Wharf. There are more tall buildings planned for the City and Canary Wharf, but there are also clusters emerging in other districts of London including: Stratford, the South Bank, Elephant and Castle, Vauxhall, Nine Elms, Islington, Lewisham as well as in places in Outer London such as Croydon.

The Greater London metropolitan area contains the second most skyscrapers of any city in Europe. There are 39 skyscrapers in Greater London that reach a roof height of at least , with 57 in Moscow, 24 in the Paris Metropolitan Area, 18 in Frankfurt, 16 in Warsaw, 6 in Manchester and Madrid, along with 5 in Milan and Rotterdam.

History

Medieval and early modern period
The history of tall structures in London began with the completion of the  White Tower, a part of the Tower of London, in 1098. St Paul's was the world's tallest structure until 1311, when its height was surpassed by Lincoln Cathedral in Lincoln. It regained the title when the spire of Lincoln Cathedral fell in 1549. Although the spire of the Old St Paul's was destroyed by lightning in 1561, it still stood as the tallest structure in London, while the world's tallest structure became Strasbourg Cathedral in Strasbourg, France. St Paul's was severely damaged by the Great Fire of London in 1666.

19th century
Few skyscrapers were built in London before the late 20th century, owing to restrictions on building heights originally imposed by the London Building Act of 1894, which followed the construction of the 14-storey Queen Anne's Mansions. Though restrictions have long since been eased, strict regulations remain to preserve protected views, especially those of St Paul's, the Tower of London and Palace of Westminster, as well as to comply with the requirements of the Civil Aviation Authority.

1960s and 1970s
The lifting of height restrictions caused a boom in the construction of tall buildings during the 1960s. One of London's first notable tall buildings was the  Centre Point, completed in 1966.

1980s, 1990s and 2000s
Its height was controversial, being contrary to the previous height restrictions, it was the tallest building in the United Kingdom at the time and also the tallest cantilever building in the world. At 50 storeys, it became the tallest building in the United Kingdom.

With the encouragement of Ken Livingstone who was Mayor of London from 2000 to 2008, a renewed trend for building tall was established in the 2000s.

Notably, some of the awards given to 30 St Mary Axe include the Emporis Skyscraper Award in 2003 and the RIBA Stirling Prize for Architecture in 2004.

2010s to present
Boris Johnson, who was Mayor of London from 2008 to 2016, approved the construction of more skyscrapers in London.

At the time of its completion in 2010, Strata SE1 was the tallest residential building in London. The Shard topped out in 2012 at London Bridge and at  remains London's tallest building.

It is the tallest skyscraper currently proposed for London and will only be exceeded in height by The Shard. However, construction was halted after concerns that the building only had one escape stairwell for residents on the upper floors. The tallest of the two Riverside South towers that have been planned for construction at Canary Wharf since 2008 would have exceeded that cluster's tallest building, One Canada Square, by 1 metre in height, but construction has been stalled since 2011.

There is another major skyscraper cluster emerging in the Vauxhall and Nine Elms districts of London. The tallest tower planned for this cluster is the  One Nine Elms City Tower.

In 2019, Sadiq Khan blocked the construction of the 290 metre tall Tulip that would have been built in the City of London. After an appeal was launched by the developers against Khan's decision, UK housing secretary Michael Gove rejected the proposal in November 2021.

Skylines

Tallest buildings and structures 
This list ranks externally complete London skyscrapers and free-standing towers that stand at least 100 m (327 ft) tall, based on standard height measurement. This includes spires and architectural details but does not include antenna masts. An equals sign (=) following a rank indicates the same height between two or more buildings. The "Year" column indicates the year in which a building was completed.

* Indicates still under construction, but has been topped-out

Tallest under construction, approved and proposed

Under construction 
This lists buildings that are under construction in London and are planned to rise at least . Under construction buildings that have already been topped out are listed above.

Approved 
This lists buildings that are approved for construction in London and are planned to rise at least .

* Table entries without text indicate that information regarding a building's expected year of completion has not yet been released.

** Approximate figure.

Proposed 

This lists buildings that are proposed for construction in London and are planned to rise at least . Once a planning application has been submitted, a decision by the relevant authority may take two or three years.

* Approximate figure.

Cancelled constructions 
This lists proposals for the construction of buildings in London that were planned to rise at least , for which planning permission was rejected or which were otherwise withdrawn.

Demolished buildings

Visions of skyscrapers 

* Estimated height.

Timeline of tallest buildings and structures 

This lists free-standing structures that have at some point held the title of tallest structure in London.

See also 
 Architecture of London
 List of tallest buildings and structures in Croydon
 City of London#Skyscrapers and tall buildings
 List of tallest buildings in the United Kingdom
 List of tallest structures in the United Kingdom

Notes

Footnotes 
 A.This structure was destroyed by the Great Fire of London in 1666, allowing a shorter structure to become the tallest in the city.
 B.The exact height of the Old St. Paul's Cathedral remains unknown. The spire was destroyed by fire in 1561.

Citations

References

External links 

 Info graphic of London's Top 10 Tallest skyscrapers
 

+
Tallest
London